The main line, or mainline in American English, of a railway is a track that is used for through trains or is the principal artery of the system from which branch lines, yards, sidings, and spurs are connected. It generally refers to a route between towns, as opposed to a route providing suburban or metro services. It may also be called a trunk line, for example the Grand Trunk Railway in Canada, the Trunk Line in Norway, and the Trunk Line Bridge No. 237 in the United States. 

For capacity reasons, main lines in many countries have at least a double track and often contain multiple parallel tracks. Main line tracks are typically operated at higher speeds than branch lines and are generally built and maintained to a higher standard than yards and branch lines. Main lines may also be operated under shared access by a number of railway companies, with sidings and branches operated by private companies or single railway companies. 

Railway points (UK) or switches (US) are usually set in the direction of the main line by default. Failure to do so has been a factor in several fatal railway accidents, for example the Buttevant Rail Disaster in Ireland, and the Graniteville train crash in the US.

References 

Rail transport operations
Railway line types